Nalini Balbir (born 1955) is a French Indologist who lives in Paris. She is a scholar of Sanskrit, Prakrit, Pali, Jainism, Buddhism and Hinduism. She was a direct student of Indologist Colette Caillat. She is known for her work on the publication of the Catalogue of the Jain Manuscripts of the British Library published by the Institute of Jainology.

Biography
Nalini Balbir was born of a French mother and an Indian father. She started her career as a teacher of French, Latin and Greek in secondary schools (1977 to 1980), before completing her PhD in Indian Studies (Études indiennes) with the edition and annotated translation of the Danastaka-katha, a book of Jain narratives in Sanskrit, which was published in 1982. Between 1982-1988 she was a Research scholar in the Centre national de la recherche scientifique, where she completed her DLitt in Indian Studies with a magisterial work on the complex Jaina Avasyaka literature which was published in 1993 under the title Avasyaka Studien. In recognition of her outstanding contributions to classical and modern Indian philology she became Professor of Indian Studies at the Sorbonne Nouvelle (University of New Sorbonne) in 1988. Dr Balbir is currently Professor for Indian Studies (Études Indiennes) at the Sorbonne Nouvelle (University of Paris-3), and since the year 2000 also Directeur d'Études for Middle-Indian Philology at the École Pratique des Hautes Études in Paris (Section des Sciences historiques et philologiques). As a trained philologist, her main areas of research are Sanskrit, Pali, Prakrit, Theravada Buddhism, Jainism, and Hindi language and literature of the 20th century. She is also a member of Pali text society in London and editor since 1983 of Bulletin d'Études Indiennes, an Indology Journal.

Publications
Balbir, N. (1983). Prakrit versions of a Pan-Indian tale ; the Monkey and the Tailor-bird, and their use in Jaina Books of discipline. OCLC Number: 469255352
Balbir, N. (1984). "Normalizing trends in Jaina narrative literature." Indologica Taurinensia 12 (1984): 25-38. OCLC Number: 469255335
Balbir, N., Oberlies, T., & Leumann, E. (1993). Āvaśyaka-Studien. Alt- und neu-indische Studien, 45, 1-2. Stuttgart: Franz Steiner. ,   OCLC Number: 30675632
Renou, L., Balbir, N., & Pinault, G.-J. (1997). [1. Védique et sanskrit - 2. Tradition grammaticale]. Choix d'études indiennes / Louis Renou. Réunis par Nalini Balbir et Georges-Jean Pinault, Tome 1. Paris: École Française d'Extrême-Orient. OCLC Number: 246231389
British Library (London), & Balbir, N. (2006). Catalogue of the Jain manuscripts of the British Library 1 Vol. 1 Introduction, bibliography, appendices, indexes, plates. ,  OCLC Number: 263433372
Caillat, C., & Balbir, N. (2008). Jaina Studies. Papers of the 12th World Sanskrit Conference. Delhi: Motilal Banarsidass. ,  OCLC Number: 470840899
Balbir, N., & Pinault, G.-J. (2009). Penser, dire et représenter l'animal dans le monde Indien. Paris: Champion.  ,   OCLC Number: 406150083

References

1955 births
Academic staff of the University of Paris
Scholars of Jainism
French Sanskrit scholars
Indian people of French descent
French Indologists
French people of Indian descent
Living people
Place of birth missing (living people)